The Paralympic Committee of Thailand (PCT) is the national Paralympic committee in Thailand for the Paralympic Games movement, based in Bangkok, Thailand. It is a non-profit organisation that selects teams and raises funds to send Thailand competitors to Paralympic events organised by the International Paralympic Committee (IPC), Asian Para Games events organised by the Asian Paralympic Committee (APC) and ASEAN Para Games events organised by the ASEAN Para Sports Federation (APSF).

The council was established on June 11, 1985, and is recognized by International Paralympic Committee (IPC) and Asian Paralympic Committee (APC). The association is headquartered in Pathum Wan, Bangkok. The current head of the federation is Gen. Prawit Wongsuwan.

Governance

Executive Board

National governing body members

Sports Association for the Disabled of Thailand

The Sports Association for the Disabled of Thailand (SADT) is the national governing body for Disabled sports . It is accredited by the International Paralympic Committee (IPC) which is the governing body for the sport for persons with a disability in the world, the Paralympic Committee of Thailand (PCT) and recognized by National Olympic Committee of Thailand (NOCT). It founded on 11 June 1985.

The association is headquartered in Pathum Wan, Bangkok. The current head of the federation is Col. Osot Pawilai.

Sports Association for the Blind of Thailand

The Sports Association for the Blind of Thailand (SABT) is the national governing body for Blind sports. It is accredited by the Paralympic Committee of Thailand (PCT).

The association is headquartered in Din Daeng, Bangkok. The current head of the federation is Mr. Suthon Jitmun.

Sports Association for the Intellectual Disability of Thailand

The Sports Association for the Intellectual Disability of Thailand (SAIT) is the national governing body for Intellectual sports. It is accredited by the Paralympic Committee of Thailand (PCT).

The association is headquartered in Bang Kapi, Bangkok. The current head of the federation is Mr. Chanwit Munikanont.

Cerebral Palsy Sports Association of Thailand

The Cerebral Palsy Sports Association of Thailand (CPSAT) is the national governing body for Cerebral palsy sports. It is accredited by the Paralympic Committee of Thailand (PCT).

The association is headquartered in Pathum Wan, Bangkok. The current head of the federation is Mr. Naiyapop Bhirombhakdi.

Deaf Sports Association of Thailand

The Deaf Sports Association of Thailand (DSAT) is the national governing body for Deaf sports. It is accredited by the Paralympic Committee of Thailand (PCT).

The association is headquartered in Pathum Wan, Bangkok.

See also
 Thailand at the Paralympics
 National Olympic Committee of Thailand

References

Thai
1985 establishments in Thailand
Sports organizations established in 1985
Sports governing bodies in Thailand
Disability organizations based in Thailand